Ida May Mack or Ida Mae Mack was an American classic female blues, country blues, and Texas blues singer and songwriter. She recorded eight songs in 1928, four of which she recorded twice. Six of these tracks were released at the time.

Little is known of her life outside the music industry.

Biography
Little is known about Mack's origins and early life. It is known that she traveled by train to Memphis, Tennessee, in 1928, alongside Bessie Tucker and Charlie Kyle, with the intention of recording for Victor. Memphis was the location of the recording studio nearest to her home, which is generally agreed to have been in Texas.

The pianist K. D. Johnson, born in Dallas, Texas, accompanied both Mack and Tucker on their recordings, which took place on 29 and 30 August 1928. Johnson was remembered by another piano player, Whistlin' Alex Moore, as "49"; Mack referred to Johnson as "Mr. 49" during his piano solos, and she composed and recorded the song "Mr. Forty-Nine Blues." In calling Johnson "Mr. 49", she used a slang name often denoting tent show performers. In Mack's version of "Elm Street Blues", she utilised the street name as "a metaphor for unrequited love".

Mack made twelve recordings, of which six were issued at the time. She recorded alternate takes of four songs: "Wrong Doin' Daddy", "Elm Street Blues", "Mr. Forty-Nine Blues", and "Good-Bye Rider".

In 1960, the Dallas-based Whistlin' Alex Moore told an interviewer that Mack and Tucker were both "tough cookies ... don't mess with them". However, in a 1972 conversation, the pianist was unable to recall the name of either singer, which led the interviewer to suspect that he had drawn his own conclusions from their recordings.

All of Mack's tracks are available on various compilation albums. Nothing is known of her life after the recording session.

Songs
All songs were written by Mack and recorded on August 29–30, 1928.

Selected compilation discography
Bessie Tucker & Ida May Mack, 1928: The Texas Moaners (Magpie Records, UK, 1979)
Bessie Tucker, Ida May Mack: Queens of Texas Blues (1928–1929). (Document, 1989)
Ida May Mack & Bessie Tucker. Backgrounds of Jazz, vol. 2.  ("X" Records, 1953)

See also
List of classic female blues singers
List of country blues musicians
List of Texas blues musicians

References

American blues singers
20th-century African-American women singers
Classic female blues singers
Country blues musicians
Texas blues musicians
Songwriters from Texas
Singers from Texas
20th-century American singers
Place of birth missing
Place of death missing
Date of birth missing
Date of death missing
20th-century American women singers
African-American songwriters